The 18th Austin Film Critics Association Awards, honoring the best in filmmaking for 2022, were announced on January 10, 2023. The nominations were announced on January 3, 2023.

Everything Everywhere All at Once led the nominations with eleven and also received the most awards with nine wins, including Best Film.

Winners and nominees
The winners are listed first and in bold.

References

External links
 Official website

2022 in Texas
2022 film awards
2022